The South American Games (also known as ODESUR Games; Spanish: Juegos Suramericanos; Portuguese: Jogos Sul-Americanos), formerly the Southern Cross Games (Spanish: Juegos Cruz del Sur) is a regional multi-sport event held between nations from South America, organized by the ODESUR (acronym for "Organización Deportiva Suramericana" – South American Sports Organization.

The first Games were held in 1978 in La Paz, Bolivia. They have since been held every four years, with the most recent edition in 2018 in Cochabamba, Bolivia. The Games have had an equivalent to the Olympic Flame since their inception: the South American Flame, which is relayed from Tiahuanaco, Bolivia, to the host city.

For the XI edition in 2018 there were two bids: Cochabamba, Bolivia, and Barquisimeto, Venezuela, with the final hosting decision in favour of Cochabamba in 2011. Starting with the 2014 edition, the South American Para Games are held for South American Paralympic athletes. Just like the Olympic Games, the host city for the South American Games is also the host for Para-South American Games.

The detailed history of the South American Games together with an extensive list of medal winners was published in a book written (in Spanish) by Argentinian journalist Ernesto Rodríguez III with support of the Argentine Olympic Committee under the auspices of the Ministry of Education in collaboration with the Sports Secretary of Argentina.

Games

Para Games

Youth Games

Beach Games

Masters Games

All-time medal count

The total medal count for all the Games until 2022 is tabulated below. This table is sorted by the number of gold medals earned by each country.  The number of silver medals is taken into consideration next, and then the number of bronze medals.

Sports

Disciplines from the same sport are grouped under the same color:

 Aquatics –
 Cycling –
 Football –
 Gymnastics –
 Roller sports –
 Volleyball

See also
 Ibero American Games
 Pan American Games
 Parapan American Games
 Central American and Caribbean Games
 Central American Games
 Bolivarian Games
 South American Masters Games
 Pan American Masters Games
 South American University Games
 World Indigenous Games
 Indigenous Peoples' Games

References

External links 
 ODESUR official website
 South American Games at ODESUR web page
 Para South American Games

 
Recurring sporting events established in 1978
Multi-sport events in South America
Games
Quadrennial sporting events